On November 8, 2022, the District of Columbia held a U.S. House of Representatives election for its shadow representative. Unlike its non-voting delegate, the shadow representative is only recognized by the district and is not officially sworn or seated. Incumbent Shadow Representative Oye Owolewa was reelected to a second term.

Primary elections
Primary elections were held on June 21, 2022. In only the Democratic race did any candidates appear on the ballot because no one filed to appear in the Republican, Libertarian, or Statehood Green primaries.

Democratic primary

Candidates

Nominee
 Oye Owolewa, incumbent Shadow Representative

Eliminated in primary
 Linda Gray, Vice Chair of the DC Democratic Party

Did not file
 Kirk Hoppe
 Harry Thomas Jr., Councilperson for Ward 5 of the D.C. council (2007-2012)

Results

Republican primary

Results

Libertarian primary

Results

Statehood Green primary
Though she did not appear on the primary ballot, Joyce Robinson-Paul, who has previously been the Statehood Green nominee for this position, most recently in 2020, won the nomination through write-ins.

Results

General election
In the November 8, 2022, general election, Owolewa defeated D.C. Statehood Green candidate Joyce Robinson-Paul.

Results

References

External links

Official campaign websites
Owolewa (D) for Shadow Representative

Washington, D.C., Shadow Representative elections
United States Shadow Representative